Stephen Malcolm (2 May 1970 – 28 January 2001) was a Jamaican international football player. His position was defender.

Club career
During his club career he played for Seba United.

International career
Nicknamed Shorty, he represented his country at the 1998 FIFA World Cup in France, which was the first and so far only time Jamaica has qualified for the finals of the tournament. He made his debut for the 'Reggae Boyz' in 1995 and collected a total of 68 caps, scoring 3 goals.

Death
Malcolm died in a car accident, only hours after playing Bulgaria in a friendly international in Kingston. He was on his way back to Montego Bay with team-mate Theodore Whitmore, when his car blew a tire, hit an embankment and overturned near Falmouth. Whitmore was injured in the accident, but fully recovered. Three years earlier Malcolm and Whitmore were involved in a car crash too, in which national team defender Durrant Brown was severely injured.

In 2011, Seba United was renamed Montego Bay United and withdrew the number 2 shirt in honour of Malcolm.

International goals

References

External links

1970 births
2001 deaths
People from Montego Bay
Association football defenders
Jamaican footballers
Jamaica international footballers
1998 CONCACAF Gold Cup players
1998 FIFA World Cup players
Road incident deaths in Jamaica
Montego Bay United F.C. players